Phillip Lee Ingle (August 7, 1961 – September 22, 1995) was an American serial killer who murdered two elderly couples in Cherryville, North Carolina in 1991. Before he was arrested, Ingle, who knew one pair of his victims, confessed to a friend, telling him that he enjoyed watching people die in agony. After being sentenced to death, he waived his appeals, saying that he wanted to spare the families of his victims from any more pain. He was executed in 1995.

Early life
Ingle was born on August 7, 1961, in Lincoln County, North Carolina. He had a very troublesome childhood. According to family friends, his mother and father split soon after he was born, and his mother was around only from time to time. In addition, family members said that Ingle's cousin sexually abused him during childhood. Ingle attempted to commit suicide when he was five or six years old, and was treated for psychiatric issues several times in the late 1980s.

Ingle previously served time in jail for breaking and entering and assault in the early 1980s.

Ingle shot himself in the stomach when he was 18 years old. In December 1986, a drunken Ingle was sent to Broughton Hospital. He was released five days later, and sent to Black Mountain's 28-day treatment program.

Murders
In July 1991, Ingle went into the home of William Fred Davis, 68, and Margaret Davis, 67. The door was unlocked, and he entered armed with an axe handle from his car. Margaret was in the kitchen, and Ingle, who knew the Davises, beat her to death. He then moved into the den of the house, where William was watching television. He did not hear Ingle attacking his wife due to the volume of the television. Consequently, Ingle was able to catch him off-guard and beat him to death as well.

Two weeks after the first two killings, Ingle tried to check himself into a state mental hospital after he was found drunk and threatening to commit suicide. He blamed his problem on alcohol and was released to the care of his brother-in-law. However, after examining him, doctors told him to seek treatment for alcoholism in a private facility and sent him home. William Rafter, the director of Black Mountain's treatment program, said Ingle's case demonstrated a problem for those who were "dually diagnosed". That is, the system did a bad job of finding and treating people who suffered from both mental illness and substance abuse problems. "Unfortunately one of the things that happens is that drug and alcohol abuse can mask the pathology," Rafter said.

Before Ingle's arrest, the Davis's 29-year-old son-in-law, Joey James Melton, was strongly suspected of the murders, but was not arrested. Melton was a high-school dropout, and the Davises has been adamantly opposed to his marriage to their daughter, Ruth Davis. However, they later helped set the family up financially giving them money for a mobile home and later a house. However, their relationship remained unstable. Neighbors and family members said Melton had personal issues which troubled the couple and possibly attracted the attention of the authorities. Newspapers reported that Melton underwent psychiatric treatment in the 1980s, and neighbors said he used to use drugs, but did not appear to be doing so prior to his death. Locals said the police very frequently questioned Melton.

"They were all over the place, and all over him," said Floyd Terry, someone who knew Melton. "I asked him straight out right after it happened. He said, 'I couldn't do nothing like that, I couldn't. And if I did, I wouldn't be crazy enough to let my wife go back there the next day.'" However, as time passed and police found no evidence linking Melton to the murders, the pressure on him seemed to ease.

In August 1991, Ingle crawled through the unlatched window into the home of E.Z. Willis, 70 and Sarah Willis, 67, and beat them to death with a tire iron. E.Z. fought back with his cane, striking Ingle several times and giving him a black eye and a gash on his face. Ingle's injuries were bad enough that he ended up skipping work.

After the second pair of murders were discovered by the couple's daughter on September 9, Melton became a suspect once more, and investigators returned to question him. The next day, he committed suicide. Melton's wife refused to reveal the contents of his suicide note.

Ingle later said he envisioned his four victims were "demons with red eyes, horns and tails", and claimed he believed he was doing God's work by killing them. Before he was arrested, Ingle confessed to a friend, telling him that he enjoyed watching people die in agony.

Trial and execution
Although a counselor believed that Ingle was mentally ill, he was ruled competent to stand trial. He pleaded not guilty by reason of insanity, but was convicted of one count of first degree burglary and four counts of first degree murder. During Ingle's trial, prosecutors presented evidence that the murders were carefully planned, and several doctors testified that Ingle did not appear to be insane at the time of the murders. After the jury deliberated, Ingle was sentenced to death. He waived all of his appeals, saying he wanted the families of his victims to have peace.

Ingle's sister appealed on his behalf, with her lawyer arguing that Ingle wasn't competent to waive his appeals. However, the North Carolina Supreme Court found that although Ingle had mental health issues, there was no evidence that he was legally insane and he was thus competent to waive his appeals. In a videotape, Ingle said the only alternative to execution which he was willing accept was lifetime commitment to a psychiatric hospital, which would have been the outcome of his trial had he been ruled insane.

At a court hearing, Ingle apologized to the relatives of his victims, saying "I have thought about these people every day. I have woke up every night with these people standing beside my bed. I have asked them forgiveness .... I have talked with them." Ingle said he didn't remember committing the murders, but claimed that just knowing what he had done was bad enough that he wanted to die.

Ingle was executed by lethal injection on September 22, 1995. His last meal consisted of a medium-rare steak, a baked potato, a tossed salad, and butter pecan ice cream. Ingle spent his final hours with his wife, their two young daughters, and his mother. As he was wheeled into the death chamber, Ingle shouted "I'm going to heaven!"

When asked if he had any last words, Ingle said "Yes. The statement I would like to make is I do not believe in capital punishment even though I have chosen to end my appeals soon. The only reason I have done this is so that the victims' families can maybe find some peace to put an end to what has happened. During the last four weeks I have felt more loved and more cared for than I have all my life I have been getting letters from all over North Carolina and the United States telling me they love me telling me of God's love for all of us and I want to thank them. I want to thank my family and I want to thank all my brothers on death row who are some of the most finest people I have met anywhere. We are all human beings we make mistakes we are all sinners of flesh. When Jesus died he took the sting away from death so that death does not sting anymore. I have repented my sins. I have been forgiven. I do not fear death now. I am not shaking. I am being put to sleep and the angels are going to pick me up and take me to Heaven. I forgive you and everyone, and I ask that everyone who I have trespassed against to forgive me."

Ingle requested that his body be cremated and his ashes scattered in South Mountain State Park in Burke County Creech.

See also
 Capital punishment in North Carolina
 List of people executed by lethal injection
 List of people executed in North Carolina
 List of serial killers in the United States

References

1961 births
1995 deaths
Executed people from North Carolina
20th-century executions by North Carolina
People executed by North Carolina by lethal injection
Executed American serial killers
People convicted of murder by North Carolina
People from Lincoln County, North Carolina
20th-century executions of American people